Ganser is a surname. Notable people with the surname include:

Daniele Ganser (b. 1972), Swiss historian
Helen Ganser (1891–1990), the first librarian at Millersville State Normal School 
Sigbert Josef Maria Ganser (1853-1931), German psychiatrist
Marguerite "Marge" Ganser (1948–1996) and Mary Ann Ganser (1948–1970), members of the girl group The Shangri-Las

See also
Ganser syndrome, a rare psychiatric disorder characterised by the individual mimicking behaviour they think is typical of a psychosis

German-language surnames
Occupational surnames